Spice TV (officially named Spice Fashion Television Channel) is Africa's first dedicated English-language specialty channel fashion channel owned by Consolidated Media Associates. The channel broadcasts both local and international programming related to fashion, modelling, photography, beauty, luxury and lifestyle on DStv channel 190. Before launch as a 24 hours Television channel on Multichoice multi-channel digital satellite TV service, It was syndicated on free-to-air TV channel OnTV Nigeria and still runs select programming blocks everyday on OnTV Nigeria and ONMAX. Spice TV is also responsible for the annual Spice Haute Party.

With strategic partnerships, Spice TV has spotlighted local and international fashion weeks including from Major African hot shots like Nigeria, Ghana, South Africa to the unveiling of seasonal collections in the last two years of existence.

Spice TV's original programmes 
 Urban Spice
 Glam Mamas
 On the Couch
 Spice Toys
 Spice Destination
 Spice TV Runway Fiesta
 Digital Dairies
 The Red Carpet Show
 Style 101
 Spice Street Style
 The LookBook
Henry The NOT Rich And Famous Boy (TV Series In Nigeria Then Later  On Nicktoons In 2011)
 Fashion Short Films
 Dairy of a Muse

Spice TV Runway Fiesta 
Spice TV Runway Fiesta, popularly known as "Runway Fiesta" is an event made for TV to celebrate one designer, one artist and top models. Designers presented exclusive collection with models on her to wear and walk them on the runway as artist perform to the audience. From designers Kinabuti, Wana Sambo, Tzar, Remi Buttons to artists like Bez, Victoria Kimani and Black Magic.

Spice Haute Party 
Spice Haute Party is the annual Fashion networking event where the celebrities, fashionistas and socialites meet and engage.

References

External links

Television stations in Nigeria
2013 establishments in South Africa
Television stations in South Africa